The Hirth HM 515 was a four-cylinder air-cooled inverted inline engine, intended to power light aircraft of the 1940s. Due to World War II, demand for the light aircraft to be powered by the HM 515 dried up and only the Siebel Si 202C Hummel was powered by development engines before further work was abandoned.

The HM 515 closely followed the Hirth formula of Elektron (magnesium alloy) castings for the crank case and covers, with roller bearings and metered oil feeds for light weight, smooth running and low oil consumption. Only a small number were produced before the war precluded further production of the light aircraft class that the engine was intended to power. Flight testing was carried out in the Si 202Cs driving a  propeller, but no production ensued.

Specifications (HM 515)

References

Further reading
 

Hirth aircraft engines
Air-cooled aircraft piston engines
1930s aircraft piston engines
Inverted aircraft piston engines